Associação Jaguaré Esporte Clube, commonly known as Jaguaré, is a Brazilian football club based in Jaguaré, Espírito Santo state. They competed in the Série C and in the Copa do Brasil once.

History
The club was founded on December 15, 2001. They won the Copa Espírito Santo in 2007. Jaguaré competed in the Série C in 2007, when they were eliminated in the First Stage of the competition. The club competed in the Copa do Brasil in 2008, when they were eliminated in the First Round by Ríver of Piauí.

Achievements
 Copa Espírito Santo:
 Winners (1): 2007

Stadium
Associação Jaguaré Esporte Clube play their home games at Centro Esportivo Conilon, nicknamed Estádio do Conilon. The stadium has a maximum capacity of 5,000 people.

References

Association football clubs established in 2001
Football clubs in Espírito Santo
2001 establishments in Brazil